Overtoun Bridge is a category B-listed structure over the Overtoun Burn on the approaching road to Overtoun House, near Dumbarton in West Dunbartonshire, Scotland. It was completed in 1895, based on a design by the landscape architect H. E. Milner.

Since the 1950s, numerous reports of dogs either falling or jumping from the bridge have been reported. Various explanations for these deaths have been proposed, ranging from natural accidents to paranormal activity.

History and construction

In 1859, the Overtoun Farm was acquired by Scottish industrialist James White, who had just started in the business of chemical manufacturing. He built the Overtoun House three years later in 1862. When White died in 1884, his son, John Campbell White, inherited the house and its estate and started planning to extend the driveway of the house across a deep ravine in order to provide easier access. He hired landscape architect and civil engineer Henry Milner to design a bridge.

The bridge was constructed using rough-faced ashlar and was completed in June 1895. It comprises three arches: a large central arch spanning a deep valley at the bottom of which flows the Overtoun Burn, flanked on each side by lower, smaller pedestrian arches.

Unexplained dog deaths

Incidents 
During the 1950s, locals started referring to the bridge as the "Bridge of Death" or the "Dog Suicide Bridge", as it was reported that dogs were leaping from the bridge into the ravine below. The story gained more prominence during the late 2000s and early 2010s. Since the original incidents were reported, 

In 2004, Kenneth Meikle was walking with his family and Golden Retriever, when the dog suddenly bolted and jumped off the bridge. It survived, but was traumatized by the experience. Going into 2005, at least five other dogs also jumped over the course of six months. In 2014, Alice Trevorrow, who was walking with her Springer Spaniel named Cassie, reported a strange experience on Overtoun Bridge. "I had parked up and as she is so obedient I didn't put her lead on... Me and my son walked toward Cassie, who was staring at something above the bridge... she definitely saw something that made her jump. There is something sinister going on. It was so out of character for her."

Proposed explanations 

A number of theories have been proposed as to the behavior of dogs on the bridge. In 2014, canine psychologist David Sands proposed that the surrounding foliage – giving the in-reality extremely steep drop off the side of the bridge the appearance of even ground – combined with the residual odor from male mink urine in the area could be culprit for luring dogs to jump off the bridge. This theory was protested by a local hunter and resident of 50 years, John Joyce, who stated that there were "no mink [in the area]." However, in an investigation by the Royal Society for the Protection of Birds, Officer David Sexton found that one end of the bridge reportedly favored by dogs contained "nests of mice, squirrels, and minks." Furthermore, in an experiment in which ten dogs were exposed to canisters filled with mouse, squirrel and mink scent, seven of the dogs "all went straight for the mink scent, many of them quite dramatically."

The Scottish Society for the Prevention of Cruelty to Animals has investigated the bridge and surrounding area, but none of their findings proved conclusive.

In 2019, the owners of Overtoun House, Bob and Melissa Hill, said that in 17 years of residing at the House, they had witnessed a number of dogs become agitated, jump up, and fall from the bridge. Bob Hill, originally a pastor from Texas, stated that the scent of mink, pine martens, and other animals agitated the dogs, resulting in their jump onto the bridge wall: "The dogs catch the scent of mink, pine martens or some other mammal and then they will jump up on the wall of the bridge. And because it’s tapered, they will just topple over." However, Hill also stated his belief that the grounds of the House held some sort of spiritual quality.

Local teacher Paul Owens argues that the bridge and nearby Overtoun House are haunted by supernatural activity. He claims that dogs and other animals are sensitive to such supernatural activity, so he proposes that dark spirits are responsible for luring dogs to their deaths.

Other incidents
In October 1994, paranoid schizophrenic Kevin Moy threw his two-week-old son Eoghan to his death from the bridge because he believed that his son was an incarnation of the Devil due to a birthmark. He chose the location due to its association with dark spirits going back to the druidic days. Following his act of murder, Moy then attempted to commit suicide several times by jumping off the bridge and slashing his wrists, but he was detained and placed in a mental health hospital.

In film and television 
In October 2022, Heel Films used Overtoun House, the bridge and the alleged paranormal activities as a basis for their 2023 short film "The Bridge" written and directed by Scott McMillan; the short film stars Christopher Wallace and Susan Sims

References

Listed bridges in Scotland
Category B listed buildings in West Dunbartonshire
Road bridges in Scotland
Deck arch bridges
Scottish folklore